

National League records
By Year

By Team (2010-2013)

Record of wins 

Other records 
Record for consecutive wins : 4 – 19/03/2011 ~ 05/04/2011
Record for consecutive draws: 4 – 13/09/2013 ~ 02/10/2013
Record for consecutive defeats: 4 – 29/06/2012 ~ 03/08/2012
Record for matches without losing: 8 – 07/04/2012 ~ 23/06/2012
Record for matches without winning: 12 – 23/07/2011 ~ 24/09/2011
Record victory: 5-0 v Yesan FC (10/04/2010) & Gangneung City (07/09/2013)
Record defeat: 0-4 v FC Seoul (18/05/2011), Korean Police FC (28/04/2012) & Ulsan Mipo Dockyard (29/06/2012)
Highest scoring match: 4-4 v Gimhae FC (01/10/2011)

Korean FA Cup records

Yongin City FC